Meraj Sheykh (born 26 May 1988) is an Iranian professional kabaddi player who currently plays for Dabang Delhi. He holds the first position for all-rounders in Pro Kabaddi League’s all-time scoring charts. His signature move – the Scorpion Kick – further accentuates his sharp reflexes and flexibility. The move requires a raider to turn towards the mid-line and then snap his back knee up to pick up a touch on a defender on the way back, similar to the sting of a scorpion.

Early life 
He was born in Iran and began playing at a young age. Before playing Kabaddi, Sheykh was a professional wrestler for 10 years and his experience in the ring has helped him be quick and agile on the mat.

Kabaddi career 
VIVO Pro Kabaddi

Season 2 
He made his debut in Season 2 with Telugu Titans and became the first foreign player to captain a Pro Kabaddi side when he was selected as their skipper for the second half of the campaign. Sheykh scored 29 raid points and 9 tackle points in his first season with the Titans.

Season 3 
Season 3 of Pro Kabaddi saw Sheykh score 27 raid points and 21 tackle points before changing allegiances in the following campaign.

Season 4 
The fourth edition of Pro Kabaddi witnessed Sheykh move to Dabang Delhi, where he was made captain. The Iranian all-rounder seemed to enjoy the added responsibility and scored 63 raid points as well as 12 tackle points.

Season 5 
Season 5 was Sheykh’s most successful in terms of points return. He scored 96 raid points, 8 tackle points and also completed 50 tackle points in league history. His total of 104 points made him the best all-rounder in the fifth edition of Pro Kabaddi.

Season 6 
In the sixth season, Sheykh continued to raid with great success and scored 94 raid points. However, the Iranian only managed 3 tackle points from 19 matches.

Iran Kabaddi team

He represented his country in the 2016 Kabaddi World Cup final, where they finished runners-up to India.

References 

1988 births
Iranian kabaddi players
Asian Games medalists in kabaddi
Kabaddi players at the 2014 Asian Games
Asian Games silver medalists for Iran
Medalists at the 2014 Asian Games
Living people
Pro Kabaddi League players